Hubert Le Blon (21 March 1874 – 2 April 1910) was a French automobilist and pioneer aviator. He drove a steam-powered Gardner-Serpollet motorcar in the early 1900s, and then switched to Hotchkiss for both the world's first Grand Prix at Le Mans in France and the inaugural Targa Florio in Sicily. At the Vanderbilt Cup races on Long Island he competed for the USA driving a Thomas

Within weeks of setting a new aviation speed record in Egypt he died during an exhibition flight at San Sebastián, Spain. His first aircraft design, the "Humber monoplane (Le Blon type)", was displayed at the Olympia Aero Exhibition in 1910.

Biography
Hubert le Blon was born at Boulogne-Billancourt, Paris, (or possibly Liancourt, Oise) on 21 March 1874.

His wife, Madame Motann Le Blon, shared his passion for motoring, regularly accompanying him as riding mechanic in his races, and watching during his flying exploits. Public statements in 1903 declared: "Madame Le Blon of Paris, has accompanied her husband on most of his record runs. [She] ... has entered her new Serpollet for the Nice races, in the coming spring, and hopes to travel at ninety miles per hour thereon."

Le Blon Frères of Boulogne-Billancourt, Paris, manufactured "Le Blon" and "Lynx" voiturettes from 1898 until possibly 1900.

Sporting career

Le Blon raced a Gardner-Serpollet steam car and set several speed records over a five-year period. Some sources report that in 1901 he drove the Gardner-Serpollet steamer to seventh place in the Paris-Berlin trail, (possibly based on an erroneous claim in his obituary in the New York Times, whilst others, including contemporaneous newspapers have no mention of him competing.).

In the 1902 Paris Grand Prix (or Paris-Arras-Paris) he finished 13th in the same Gardner-Serpollet steamer.

In 1903 Paris-Madrid race he was classified 17th in his Serpollet (after 6 hours 44 minutes 15 seconds) when the race was stopped by the police at Bordeaux due to the number of fatalities. (This race is sometimes known by its post-facto rename of VIII Grand Prix de l'A.C.F.)

In 1904 he was fifth in the Circuit des Ardennes held at Bastogne circuit, in a Hotchkiss. He participated at the Arras Speed Trials in a Serpollet steamer.

In 1905 he was hired to race French Hotchkiss and Panhard cars, and in several races his wife acted as his riding mechanic.

In 1906 he drove a Hotchkiss in both the world's first Grand Prix at Le Mans in France and at the inaugural Targa Florio in Sicily.

In 1906 he was selected by the Thomas Motor Company to race as an unpaid amateur at the American Elimination Trial for the Vanderbilt Cup, having been an employee of the French branch of E. R. Thomas Motor Co. His second place qualified for the five-car American Team, but at the main Vanderbilt Cup race he only completed nine laps. His riding mechanic was Marius Amiel.

In 1907 he drove a De Luca-Daimler in the 2nd Targa Florio, finishing 20th, 1 hour 13 minutes after the winner Felice Nazzaro. On 2 July he was badly injured when he crashed his Panhard on the 4th lap of the Grand Prix de l'Automobile Club de France at Dieppe. This led to a long period of convalescence.

Aviation

By 1909, like many other racers of the era, Le Blon became fascinated by aviation. He enrolled at the pilot training school of pioneering French aviator Léon Delagrange, learning to fly the Bleriot XI monoplane. Delagrange died three months before Le Blon, in an accident similar to the one that would kill Le Blon.

In 1909 Le Blon competed at the Spa aviation meeting in September–October before travelling to Doncaster, England, where he was the "first aviator to take-off at the first ever Air Show in Great Britain", held at the venue of the St. Leger Stakes. He rapidly became "as well known as Bleriot" for his skilled, daring and courageous flying, winning the Bradford Cup for the fastest ten laps of the course in his Blériot monoplane. He further endeared himself to the public on 25 October when he after taking off in very strong winds was hurled at the crowds by a strong gust, but manoeuvred to skim over the crowd, stall and then crash-land in a crowd-free area.

His renown as an aviator increased when, in February 1910, he set a new five-kilometre record of 4 minutes 2 seconds in his Bleriot XI monoplane at the Héliopolis International Air Meeting near Cairo, Egypt.

Le Blon's first aircraft design, the Humber monoplane (Le Blon type), was displayed at the Aero Exhibition at Olympia, London in 1910. Although the project showed creative ingenuity – he planned to sit astride it like a horse – the death of Le Blon led to its termination.

Death

Le Blon drowned in a crash landing into the sea on 2 April 1910 while flying in stormy weather at Ondarreta Beach, San Sebastián, Spain, where he had been performing exhibition flights since 27 March. He was reportedly circling the Royal Palace of Miramar at about 140 feet when the Anzani engine failed; as he attempted to glide back to land, a wing's wire "stay" snapped whereupon the plane flipped and crashed into the sea upside down, possibly colliding with some rocks. His wife was among the crowd that was watching.

The New York Times headlined the story thus:

According to official documents the cause of death was "drowning" although his body was injured in the impact. The official cause of the crash was attributed to "fracture of one of the wing stay wires when running into a gust of wind".

His death was reported as the sixth person in history to die in an aeroplane accident. He was awarded an Aviator's Certificate by the Aéro-Club de France in 1910.

At his funeral in San Sebastián the streets were lined with troops, shops were closed, and thousands followed his coffin to the railway station where it was transported to Paris.

Results

See also
1904 Gordon Bennett Cup
1905 Gordon Bennett Cup
Le Blon – 1898 French motor manufacturer

References

Other sources
Cited by Motorsport Memorial.
Book A History of Aeronautics by E. Charles Vivian, Book Jungle, 2009, .
Magazine "Progress" (Wellington, New Zealand), issue of 1 June 1910, article "Death of Le Blon", page 270, retrieved by website .
Magazine Flight, issue of 9 April 1910, retrieved by website .
Website The New York Times - Archive, issue 3 April 1910, article "AERONAUT IS DASHED TO DEATH ON ROCKS; Le Blon, Once *Famous Motorist, Was Circling Spanish Royal Palace at San Sebastian.", page .
Website Fundación Aérea de la Comunidad Valenciana, Aircraft Recovering - Bleriot XI Project, page .
Website The GEL Motorsport Information Page by Darren Galpin, page  and page .
Website [www.gdecarli.it ] by Guido de Carli, chapter "Results: Jimmy Piget's Archives - Killed (or deceased when active) drivers", compiled by Jimmy Piget, page http://www.gdecarli.it/Risultati/Piget/2005/7%20-%20killed.pdf .
Website Mediatheque Ville Le Mans, page .
Website Le Mans & Formula 2 Register by Stefan Örnerdal, page .

Cited by Darren Galpin of Team Dan:
Ian Morrison: Guinness Motor Racing - The Records
Ian Morrison: Guinness Book of Formula One
Nigel Mansell: My Autobiography, Collins Willow
Peter Higham: The Guinness Guide To International Motor Racing
Timothy Collings: Schumacher, Bloomsbury
Steve Small: The Guinness Complete Grand Prix Who's Who, Volumes 1 and 2
Alan Henry: The Turbo Years, Crowood
Alan Henry: Damon Hill, On Top of the World, PSL
Mike Lang: Grand Prix! Vol 4, 1981–84, Haynes
Doug Nye: History of the Grand Prix Car 1966-91, Hazleton
Doug Nye: History of the Grand Prix Car 1945-65, Hazleton
Doug Nye and Geoff Crammond: Classic Racing Cars, Haynes
Paul Lawrence and Peter Stow: Castle Combe - The First 50 Years, TFM
William Body: The History of Motor Racing, Book Club Associates
Ivan Rendall: The Power and the Glory, BBC Books
Paul Sheldon: A Record of Grand Prix and Voiturette Racing, vols 1, 5 and 6
Janos Wimpffen: Time and Two Seats, Motorsport Research Group
Autosport Magazine
Motorsport Magazine

External links

Txintxua Films. Hubert Le Blon The last flight of Hubert Le Blon. The last moments in the life of a man who dreamed with dragonflies when he was a child and died being a pioneer of acrobatic flights.
Amazon, Prints of Hubert le Blon, in his Gardner-Serpollet steam car, Nice, 1903. from Heritage-Images. Hubert le Blon, in his Gardner-Serpollet steam car, Nice, 1903. Gardner-Serpollet was a French manufacturer of steam-powered cars in the early 1900s. A print from La Vie au Grand Air, 18 November 1903. Hubert le Blon,Leon Serpollet,Unknown (creator), Nice Nice, Provence-Alpes-Cote dAzur, France
TeamDan, Early results database - 1901
TeamDan, Early results database - 1903
TeamDan, Early results database - 1908
TeamDan, Early results database - 1909
TeamDan, Early results database - 1910

1874 births
1910 deaths
Sportspeople from Paris
French racing drivers
Grand Prix drivers
Aviation pioneers
Aviation history of France
Aviators killed in aviation accidents or incidents in Spain
French aviation record holders
Victims of aviation accidents or incidents in 1910